The Pope John Paul II bibliography contains a list of works by Pope John Paul II, and works about his life and theology. Pope John Paul II reigned as pope of the Catholic Church and sovereign of Vatican City for 26 years and six months (October 1978–April 2005). Works written and published prior to his election to the papacy are attributed to Karol Wojtyła. Additional resources can be found on the Vatican website.

Books
The following is a list of books written by John Paul II both before and after becoming pope, although pre-papacy his name was Karol Wojtyla.

 – This was the author's first doctoral dissertation at the Pontifical University of St. Thomas Aquinas (Angelicum) in Rome. 
 – This was the author's habilitation thesis.
 – This was the author's first published book, integrating his pastoral experience with young people with a penetrating philosophical analysis of the conditions for true love. The book addresses such issues as attraction, desire, sentiment, sensuality, shame, friendship, and justice toward the Creator.
 Promieniowanie ojcostwa, under a pseudonym Andrzej Jawień, 1964.
 – This is a major philosophical work directed to the person, which involves the use of the metaphysics of St. Thomas Aquinas for all that is objective in man and the phenomenological method for the study of man's personal subjectivity. 
 – This book is a guide to the pastoral synod of the Archdiocese of Kraków in their deliberations, and introduces the reader to the documents of Vatican II and how they can be implemented as a response of faith to God's action through the Council.
 – This is the first English translation of Osoba i czyn. 
 – This is the first English translation of Miłość i odpowiedzialność. This book analyzes sex, romantic attraction, lust, and spousal love by determining the conditions necessary for true love.
 –  Essays were originally published in Polish between 1955-1977. The collection is indispensable for understanding Wojtyla's synthesis of Thomism with phenomenology and for understanding Thomism as Thomistic Personalism.
 – This book is a conversational presentation of two retreats Karol Wojtyła gave 10 years apart before becoming pope. During that time he served in Kraków as bishop and cardinal.
 – This book presents the author's many teachings and ideas.
 – This book is a compilation of weekly lectures titled Theology of the Body, delivered from 1979 to 1984 to married couples about the deep meaning of human love and sexuality.
 – The author's thoughts on the priesthood and how the event of the Incarnation in world history is manifest daily in the lives of priests who have been chosen to follow in His footsteps.
 – This book is a carefully selected compilation of words and prayers of the author, compiled by Anthony F. Chiffolo.
 Roman Triptych (Meditation) – 6 March (2003), in Italy published by Libreria Editrice Vaticana 
 Rise, Let Us Be On Our Way, Warner Books (28 September 2004), mostly addressed to his bishops, although it has been used as source of inspiration for others having knowledge of Christianity.
 Memory and Identity – Conversations at the Dawn of a Millennium, published by Rizzoli (22 March 2005) , conversational presentation of John Paul II's views on many secular topics, such as evil, freedom, contemporary Europe, nationalism, and democracy. Included in the book is also a transcript of the Pope's discussion o his assassination attempt in 1981.
 Man and Woman He Created Them: A Theology of the Body [John Paul II; Translated by Dr. Michael Waldstein] Pauline Books & Media, 2006. , a new translation in English created from the newly discovered original Polish work written by John Paul II
(Promulgated by Pope John Paul II), Catecismo de la Iglesia Catolica, Doubleday, 2006.

Plays
The following is a list of plays written by Pope John Paul II.
 David 
 Job
 Jeremiah
 The Jeweler's Shop: A Meditation on the Sacrament of Matrimony, Passing on Occasion into a Drama, Arrow, (17 March 1980) .
 Our God's Brother, Ave Maria Press (1995) , play written by Karol Wojtyła in Poland during World War II at a time when Nazis were suppressing Polish culture (1944).
 La Bottega dell'orefice (English: The Jeweler's Shop), 88 min (Canada) / 95 min (USA), 1988, colour, directed by Michael Joseph Anderson.
 Our God's brother (in Polish: Brat naszego Boga), 123 min, 1997, colour, directed by Krzysztof Zanussi.

Poetry
The following is a list of books of poetry written by Pope John Paul II.
 The Place Within: The Poetry of Pope John Paul II, Random House; 1st edition (25 October 1994) , lyrical poetry
 Roman Triptych. Meditations, Libreria Editrice Vaticana, (Vatican) March 2003), 
 The Poetry of Pope John Paul II, USCCB (1 September 2003) , poems written in the summer of 2002.

Audio

The following is a list of audio recordings produced by Pope John Paul II.
 Sings at the Festival of Sacrosong (1979), Infinity Entertainment Group
 Rosario del Papa (1994), Max Music & Entertainment
 Rosario (1994), ISR Records (Spanish)
 A Celebration of Mass (1995), BMG Video
 El Santo Rosario (1995), Sony Music Distribution
 Pope of the Rosary (1995), Trinity Records (English, Spanish)
 Der Papst in Paderborn (1996), Titan (German)
 Abbà Pater (1999), Sony Music Distribution
 Pope John Paul II (2000), Gateway
 Papal Blessing/Ave Maria (2000), Gateway Records
 Du Bist Petrus (2000), Universal Music
 Orbi Millennium (2003), Beaux
 Piesni Polakow dla Papieza (2004), GM Recordings
 Papst Johannes Paul II in Deutschland (2005), Sonia
 Die Helligen Vater in Deustschland (2005), Delta Distribution

Encyclicals
Pope John Paul II issued 14 Papal encyclicals during his reign as Pope of the Catholic Church for over 26 years, from his election on 16 October 1978 until his death on 2 April 2005. Encyclicals (from Latin encyclia, from the Greek "en kyklo, ", meaning "general" or "encircling") were originally circular letters sent to all the churches of a particular area in the early Christian church.

For the modern Catholic Church, a papal encyclical, in the strictest sense, is a letter sent by the Pope which is explicitly addressed to Catholic bishops of a particular area or to the world, usually treating some aspect of Catholic doctrine. A papal encyclical is generally used for significant issues, and is second in importance only to the highest ranking document now issued by popes, an Apostolic Constitution.

The title of a Papal Encyclical is usually taken from its first few words. Pope John Paul II issued his first encyclical, Redemptor hominis, on 4 March 1979. Ecclesia de Eucharistia, his last encyclical, was issued on 17 April 2003.

Apostolic exhortations
 Apostolic Exhortations of John Paul II from the Vatican
 Apostolic Exhortations of John Paul II from ETWN

Notable exhortations
Notable Apostolic Exhortations of Pope John Paul II include:

 Catechesi Tradendae (Catechesis in Our Time, 1979)
 Christifideles laici (Christ’s Faithful People, 1988)
 Ecclesia in America (The Church in America, 1999)
 Ecclesia in Asia (The Church in Asia, 1999)
 Ecclesia in Europa (The Church in Europe)
 Familiaris consortio (The Christian Family in the Modern World, 1981)
 Pastores dabo vobis (Shepherds After My Own Heart (on priestly formation), 1992)
 Pastores gregis (The Shepherds of the Lord's Flock, 2003)
 Reconciliatio et paenitentia (Reconciliation and Penance, 1984)
 Redemptoris custos (Guardian of the Redeemer (On the person and mission of Saint Joseph), 1989) 
 Vita consecrata (Consecrated Life, 1996)

Apostolic letters
Christifideles Laici: The Lay Members of Christ's Faithful People, 1988. Christifideles laici explains the urgent indispensability of the laity to bring God's love into the world.
 Dies Domini - Dies Domini is an apostolic letter promulgated by Pope John Paul II on July 30, 1998. In this doctrine, Pope John Paul encourages the Catholic population to 'rediscover the meaning' behind keeping the Lord's Day holy.
Mulieris Dignitatem: On the Dignity and Vocation of Women on the Occasion of the Marian Year, 1988. Mulieris Dignitatem defends the equality of women, the vocation to love, the mutual submission of husbands and wives, the on-going impact of Original Sin on male/female relationships, Jesus's modeling of how to treat women,  the significance of Jesus's mother for today's Christians, and the nature of the relationship between Christ and His Church including the role of the Eucharist as expressing the total self-gift of Christ and making possible the reciprocal total self-gift of the recipient. 
 Novo millennio ineunte- (At the beginning of the new millennium) is an apostolic letter of Pope John Paul II, addressed to the Bishops Clergy and Lay Faithful, "At the Close of the Great Jubilee of 2000".
 Ordinatio sacerdotalis 
 Salvifici doloris "Redemptive Suffering"
Apostolic Letters of John Paul II from Vatican web site
 Apostolic Letters of John Paul II from EWTN (Selected letters)
 The Rapid Development - The Rapid Development (Il Rapido Sviluppo) is an apostolic letter written by Pope John Paul II in 2005 to those who are involved in communications.
 Rosarium Virginis Mariae - letter from 2002 proclaiming a "Year of the Rosary" and introducing the Luminous Mysteries.

Apostolic constitutions
 Ut sit (1982) Pope John Paul II's Apostolic Constitution raising Opus Dei (Latin for "The Work of God") to the rank of a Personal Prelature (similar to a diocese, but grouping people by some peculiar pastoral reason instead of by where they live)
 Sacrae Disciplinae Leges (1983) Pope John Paul II's constitution instituting the 1983 Code of Canon Law
 Pastor Bonus (1988) — Pope John Paul II's rules on the re-organisation of the Roman Curia
 Ex corde ecclesiae (1990) — John Paul II's rules on Catholic universities
 Fidei depositum (1992) Pope John Paul II's Apostolic Constitution on the new Catechism of the Catholic Church
 Universi Dominici gregis (1996)—Pope John Paul II's rules on electing the Roman Pontiff (the Pope)

Pastoral letters 
Letter to Children, 1994
Letter to Families (Gratissima Sane), 1994
Letter to Priest, 1994
Letter to the Secretary General of the International Conference on Population and Development, 1994
 Letter to Women, 1995
 Link to other letters on the Vatican website

References
Notes

Citations

Further reading

The following is a list of works about the life and theology of Pope John Paul II.
 Pope John Paul II: The Biography, Tad Szulc, Scribner, 1995.
 His Holiness: John Paul II and the History of Our Time, Carl Bernstein and Marco Politi, Doubleday, 1996.
 Man of the Century: The Life and Times of Pope John Paul II, Jonathan Kwitny, Henry Holt and Company, 1997.
 The Hidden Pope, Dacry O'Brien, Daybreak Books (1998) 
 Witness to Hope, George Weigel, HarperCollins (1999, 2001) 
 The End and the Beginning: Pope John Paul II–The Victory of Freedom, the Last Years, the Legacy, George Weigel, Doubleday, 2010, 
 Lessons in Hope: My Unexpected Life with St. John Paul II, George Weigel, Basic Books, 2017, 
 Pray the Rosary with Saint John Paul II, Scott L. Smith, Jr., Holy Water Books, 2020, 
 Universal Father, Garry O'Connor, Bloomsbury Publishing plc, 2005, 
 John Paul II: An Illustrated Biography, Andrzej Nowak, Kluszczynski, Kraków, 2005
 Let Me Go to the Father's House: John Paul II's Strength in Weakness, Stanisław Dziwisz, Czesław Drazek, SJ, Renato Buzzonetti, Angelo Comastri, Pauline Books & Media, 2006. 
 Lolek, The Boy Who Became Pope John Paul II, Mark Hoffman, Mary Hramiec Hoffman, Hramiec Hoffman Inc., 2009, 
 Köchler, Hans, The Phenomenology of Karol Wojtyła. On the Problem of the Phenomenological Foundation of Anthropology, in: Philosophy and Phenomenological Research, Vol. 42 (1982), pp. 326–334
 Buttiglione, Rocco, Karol Wojtyła: The Thought of the Man Who Became Pope John Paul II, Grand Rapids, Mich. & Cambridge, UK, Wm. B. Eerdmans Publishing Co., 1997. 
 Simpson, Peter, On Karol Wojtyła, Belmont, CA, Wadsworth Publishing, 2000. 
 Kupczak, Jarosław, Destined for Liberty: The Human Person in the Philosophy of Karol Wojtyła/John Paul II, Washington, DC, The Catholic University of America Press, 2000. 
 Jeffreys, Derek, Defending Human Dignity, Baker / 2004 / Paperback,  (pbk.)
 Köchler, Hans, Karol Wojtyła's Notion of the Irreducible in Man and the Quest for a Just World Order (Saint Joseph College, USA, 2006)
 Mannion, Gerard (ed.), The Vision of John Paul II: Assessing His Thought and Influence,  Collegeville, MN, Liturgical Press, 2008. 
 Meissen, Randall J., "Living Miracles: The Spiritual Sons of John Paul the Great," Alpharetta, GA, Mission Network, 2011. 
 Evert, Jason. Saint John Paul the Great: His Five Loves. Totus Tuus Press, 2014.

The following are books in Polish about Pope John Paul's literary output by his translator and friend, Bolesław Taborski:
 Karola Wojtyły dramaturgia wnętrza Publisher: Wydawnictw Katolickiego Uniwersytetu Lubelskiego; Wyd. 1 edition, 1989  "Karol Woytyła's Theatre of the Interior" 
 Wprost w moje serce uderza droga wszystkich: o Karolu Wojtyle Janie Pawle II - szkice, wspomnienia, wiersze, Toruń : A. Marszałek, cop. 2005, "Everyone's journey makes my heart jump: about Karol Woytyła John Paul II - sketches, recollections, poems"

External links
PapalEncyclicals.net – Pope John Paul II – online copies

 Śmieja, Florian on Taborski and John Paul II's Literary creativity - in Polish, http://www.cultureave.com/w-polskiej-sekcji-bbc-boleslaw-taborski-przepracowal-34-lata-redagujac-magazyn-artystyczno-literacki-tlumaczac-angielskie-sztuki-i-sporzadzajac-sprawozdania-z-festiwali-artystycznych-byla-to-ciezka/ accessed 10 February 2018
 Vatican website - John Paul II

Bibliographies of people
Bibliographies by writer
Christian bibliographies
Bibliography